is a Japanese idol girl group established in December 2011. Their singles "Baitofaitaa" and "Otomegokoro no kagi/The kagayakeru" reached the third place on the weekly Oricon Singles Chart.

Discography

Albums

Singles

References

External links

Japanese idol groups
Japanese girl groups
2011 establishments in Japan
Musical groups established in 2011
Warner Music Japan artists